Zak McKracken and the Alien Mindbenders is a 1988 graphic adventure game by Lucasfilm Games. It was the second game to use the SCUMM engine, after Maniac Mansion. The project was led by David Fox, with Matthew Alan Kane as the co-designer and co-programmer.

Like Maniac Mansion, it was developed for the Commodore 64 and later released in 1988 for that system and DOS.

Plot
The story is set in 1997, nine years after the game's production. The plot follows Zak, a writer for the National Inquisitor, a tabloid newspaper; Annie Larris, a freelance scientist; and Melissa China and Leslie Bennett, two Yale University coed students, in their attempt to prevent the nefarious alien Caponians (who have taken over "The Phone Company", an amalgamation of various telecommunication companies around the world) from slowly reducing the intelligence of everybody on Earth by emitting a 60 Hz "hum" from their "Mind Bending Machine". The Skolarians, another ancient alien race, have left a defense mechanism hanging around to repulse the Caponians (the "Skolarian Device"), which needs reassembly and start-up, but the parts are spread all over Earth and Mars.

Development
Zak McKracken and the Alien Mindbenders was developed and published by Lucasfilm Games. It was the second game to use the SCUMM engine, after Maniac Mansion. Like Maniac Mansion, Zak McKracken was initially developed for the Commodore 64 and ported later to other systems. The project was led by David Fox, with Matthew Alan Kane as the co-designer and co-programmer. Fox consulted with New Age writer David Spangler for the game materials. The game was originally meant to be more serious, resembling the Indiana Jones series, but Ron Gilbert persuaded David Fox to increase the humorous aspects of the game. The game was consequently heavily inspired by many popular theories about aliens, ancient astronauts, and mysterious civilizations. The many places visited in the game are common hotspots for these ideas, such as the pyramids of Egypt and Mexico, Lima, Stonehenge, the Bermuda Triangle, and the Face on Mars. The Skolarians are based on the Greys alien, while the Caponians (a name derived from "Al Capone") are primarily based on the Men in Black, with their Cadillac-shaped spaceship and Elvis-themed leader (nicknamed "The King"). The Caponians also have heads shaped like Easter Island's Moai statues.

Release 
Zak McKracken was originally released in October 1988, for the C64, self-published by Lucasfilm Games. A port to IBM PC (DOS) followed in the same year. In 1989, the game was ported to the Amiga and Atari ST. A DOS version with enhanced graphics was also released.

The Japanese version of the game was released in 1990 under the title Zak McKracken ( Zakkumakkurakken); for the Japanese Fujitsu FM Towns computer. Produced by Douglas Crockford, it came on CD-ROM with 256-color graphics and a remastered sampled audio soundtrack. It is playable in both English and Japanese. When this version is played in Japanese, the sprites' eyes are replaced with anime eyes. The box art was redrawn for the Japanese market by artist Yuzuki Hikaru (弓月光), otherwise known as Nishimura Tsukasa (西村司).

Re-release
In March 2015, Zak McKracken was re-released on the digital distribution platform gog.com after years of non-availability. The GOG.com release marked the first time the 256-color version of the game had been made officially available outside Japan.

Reception
Discussing Zak McKrackens commercial performance, David Fox later wrote, "I think Zak was far more popular in Germany and Europe than in the States. I'm not sure why... maybe my humor was more European in nature?"

Many reviews, both online and in print, rate Zak McKracken as among the best adventure games ever made, but others disagree. A review in Computer Gaming World described Zak McKracken as a good game, but said that it could have been better. The magazine described the game's central flaw in the game's environments, limited to a relatively small number of screens per location, giving each town a movie-set feel compared to the size and detail of Maniac Mansion. Compute! favorably reviewed Zak McKracken, but wished that Lucasfilm would next produce a game that did not depend on jokes and puzzles to tell its story. The large number of mazes in the game was also a source of criticism, but David Fox felt it was the best way to maximize the game's size and still have it fit on a single Commodore 64 floppy disk. Other critics complained about the need to enter copy protection codes not once, but multiple times whenever the player flew out of the US.

The game was reviewed in 1989 in Dragon No. 142 by Hartley, Patricia, and Kirk Lesser in "The Role of Computers" column. The reviewers gave the game  out of 5 stars.

The game received high scores in general press. It received 90 out of 100 in several reviews, such as of Zzap!, Power Play, Happy Computer, HonestGamers, Pixel-Heroes.de, Jeuxvideo.com, ST Action, and Quandary magazines.

Legacy
The title of the Teenage Mutant Ninja Turtles episode "Zach and the Alien Invaders" pays homage to this game's title.

Fan sequels
Some Zak McKracken fans have created and released their own sequels, so called fangames, among which:
 The New Adventures of Zak McKracken, released in March 2002 by "LucasFan Games" and containing graphics from the Japanese FM Towns 256 color version and country-specific backgrounds from various Neo-Geo games. The original release was notorious for containing an adult ending. However, the ending was soon changed when the developers were told that the female characters were based on actual persons. This sequel is very short and fairly limited compared to the two other fan sequels.
 Zak McKracken: Between Time and Space, released in German in April 2008 and re-released as a director's cut in German, English and French (subtitles) in May 2015 by "Artificial Hair Bros.". The game consists of hand-drawn 2D scenes and sprites and pre-rendered 3D videos. It uses the Visionaire Studio engine that professional developers like Daedalic use.

Other notable but unreleased fan sequels include:
 Zak McKracken and the Alien Rockstars, which was planned for a final release in 2007 following the release of a demo. After several project restarts and lead changes the project was stopped. However, the game engine's source code was released on SourceForge.
 Zak McKracken and the Lonely Sea Monster was scheduled for July 1, 2007, but has come to a halt. It was supposed to maintain the look of the original.

References

External links
 
 Zak McKracken and the Alien Mindbenders at Lemon64
 The Zak McKracken Archive
 Zak McKracken C-64 version theme at the High Voltage SID Collection
 Zak's Theme, original 1987 recording predating the in-game versions
 Zak McKracken Between Time and Space
 
 Zak McKracken and the Alien Mindbenders - re-released by Disney/Lucasfilm on GOG.com for Windows, Mac, Linux (March 19, 2015)

1988 video games
Adventure games
Amiga games
Atari ST games
Commodore 64 games
DOS games
Fangames
FM Towns games
LucasArts games
Point-and-click adventure games
Science fiction video games
SCUMM games
ScummVM-supported games
U.S. Gold games
Video games about ancient astronauts
Video games about extraterrestrial life
Video games developed in the United States
Video games developed in Japan
Video games set in 1997
Video games set in Africa
Video games set in Atlantis
Video games set in Bermuda
Video games set in Egypt
Video games set in London
Video games set on Mars
Video games set in Mexico
Video games set in Miami
Video games set in Nepal
Video games set in Peru
Video games set in San Francisco
Video games set in Seattle
Video games featuring female protagonists